The 2016–17 season was Blackpool F.C.'s 108th season in the Football League, and their first season back in League Two following relegation from the 2015–16 Football League One. Along with competing in League Two, the club also participated in the FA Cup, League Cup and Football League Trophy. The season covers the period from 1 July 2016 to 30 June 2017.

Transfers

Transfers in

Transfers out

Loans in

Loans out

Competitions

Pre-season friendlies

League Two

League table

Results by matchday

Matches

Play-offs

FA Cup

EFL Cup

EFL Trophy

Statistics

|-
|colspan=14|Players out on loan:

|-
|colspan=14|Players that left the club:

|}

Goals record

Disciplinary Record

References

Blackpool
Blackpool F.C. seasons